LeRoy Davis White (1888 – 1955) was a member of the Utah House of Representatives and mayor of Perry, Utah.

White was born in Perry, Utah where he lived most of his life. He was a farmer, banker and also involved in real estate transactions. He served as a member of the Utah House of Representatives. He was also mayor of Perry, Utah. He served as a ward bishop of the Church of Jesus Christ of Latter-day Saints for 11 years. White also served for a time as a member of the Box Elder County School board.

White was the father of Dentzel White, who married Russell M. Nelson, who eventually became a member of the Quorum of the 12 apostles of the Church of Jesus Christ of Latter-day Saints and after her death president of that Church.

Sources
Spencer J. Condie. Russell M. Nelson: Father, Surgeon, Apostle Salt Lake City: Deseret Book, 2003. Chapter 5.

1888 births
20th-century American politicians
1955 deaths
American leaders of the Church of Jesus Christ of Latter-day Saints
Date of birth missing
Date of death missing
Latter Day Saints from Utah
Mayors of places in Utah
Members of the Utah House of Representatives
People from Box Elder County, Utah
Place of death missing